In computer science and engineering, a test vector is a set of inputs provided to a system in order to test that system.  In software development, test vectors are a methodology of software testing and software verification and validation.

Rationale

In computer science and engineering, a system acts as a computable function. While testing the system, various test vectors must be used to examine the system's behavior with differing inputs.

Example
For example, consider a login page with two input fields: a username field and a password field. In that case, the login system can be described as:
 
 

Making things more generic, we can suggest that the function  takes input as a 2-dimensional vector and outputs a one-dimensional vector (scalar).
This can be written in the following way:-

with 

In order to test the login page, it is necessary to pass some sample input vectors .  In this context  is called a test vector.

See also
Automatic test pattern generation

References 

Test Vector Guidelines.  
Test Vector Considered Harmful.  

Computer engineering
Test items